Byron August Wilson (1918–1992) was an American mid-20th century artist and educator, known for his jewelry design.

Life
Wilson was born in Alameda, California. Although self-taught, Wilson was known for his jewelry design and art during the California studio jewelry movement in the 1950s, 60s, and 70s. 

In 1951, Wilson was one of the founding member of the Metal Arts Guild of San Francisco. Margaret De Patta, another of the founding members, had an influence on his work. In 1956, the California College of Arts and Crafts (CCAC) hired him to teach in the metal arts department, where he worked for 26 years. With help from students, he created the CCACs first metal foundry. During this period, he also worked as a claims inspector for Southern Pacific Railroad.

Wilson's art incorporated geometric shapes formed from materials such as ebony wood and ivory. He also made use of unconventional casting methods to create his metal pieces.

In 1981, Byron Wilson filed a patent for an improved type of flap sander (pat. no. 4,365,448). The tool consisted of a slotted cylinder and cover plate which held replaceable strips of sandpaper.
Byron Wilson died in 1992.

The Los Angeles County Museum of Art (LACMA) has an extensive collection of Byron Wilson's pieces.

The Museum of Fine Arts in Boston (MFA) has one example of Wilson's work in their collection.

Honors and awards 
1952 First prize, "Pacifica," Oakland, California
1952 First prize and honorable mention, San Francisco Art Festival
1955 Art Commission Purchase Award, San Francisco Art Festival
1955 Honorable mention, Richmond Annual Exhibition of Watercolor, Graphic and Decorative Arts
1955 First prize and special award, Lafayette Art Show
1955 Honorable mention, "Fiber, Clay and Metal," St. Paul Art Gallery
1955 First prize, California State Fair
1957 Purchase award and honorable mention, "American Jewelry and Related Objects," Memorial Art Gallery, University of Rochester<ref

name=":0" />
1957 Award of merit, "Designer Craftsmen of the West," de Young Museum, San Francisco
1981 Honorable mention, California State Fair

Selected exhibitions
1951, 1952, 1954, 1955, 1956, 1957, 1968, 1969, 1973, 1974 and 1975 San Francisco Art Festivals, San Francisco, California
1952–1953 Traveling Exhibit of California Craftsmen, American Federation of Art
1953, 1954, 1956, 1957, 1958, 1966, 1969 Richmond Annual Exhibition of watercolor, graphic and decorative arts, Richmond, California
1953 and 1955 "Fiber, Clay and Metal," St. Paul Art Gallery, St. Paul, Minnesota
1955 "84 Contemporary Jewelers," Walker Art Center, Minneapolis, MN
1957 "American Jewelry and Related Objects," Memorial Art Gallery, University of Rochester, Rochester, New York
1956 Inaugural exhibition, Museum of Contemporary Crafts, New York City
1956 and 1957 "Craftsmanship in a Changing world," Smithsonian Institution, Washington, DC, traveling exhibition
1971 "The Metal Experience," Oakland Museum, Oakland, California

References

Artists from the San Francisco Bay Area
California College of the Arts faculty
1918 births
1992 deaths
20th-century American artists